Beaufort County is a county in the U.S. state of South Carolina. As of the 2020 census, its population was 187,117. Its county seat is Beaufort and its largest town is Hilton Head Island.

Beaufort County is part of the Hilton Head Island–Bluffton, SC Metropolitan Statistical Area. It is one of the South's fastest-growing counties, primarily because of development south of the Broad River clustered along the U.S. Highway 278 corridor. The county's northern portions have also grown steadily, due in part to the strong federal military presence around the city of Beaufort. The county's two portions are connected by the Broad River Bridge, which carries South Carolina Highway 170. Beaufort County has been identified as the most at-risk county in the contiguous United States for combined damage from climate change in the medium term.

History

From the early days of plantations, African slaves outnumbered the European minority in the colony. The plantations on the Sea Islands had large concentrations of slaves, and frequently limited interaction with whites. The islands were sites of the development of the Gullah culture, which preserved elements from a variety of West African roots; the people also developed the Gullah language, a creole language. The county was majority black nearly to the mid-20th century.

Union troops took control of Beaufort County and occupied the area beginning in 1861. Many slaves escaped and went to Union lines. In some cases, planters had moved inland for refuge, leaving their slaves on the Sea Islands. Slaves began to organize schools and other parts of their communities early in the war in this county, especially on the islands. The Army founded Mitchellville on Hilton Head by March 1863 as a village where blacks could practice self-governance, and in 1865 it had 1500 residents. After the war, the Drayton family reclaimed this land for its use. In some cases, the Union Army allocated plots for blacks for housing and cultivating crops.

When freedmen were granted citizenship and the franchise after the American Civil War by constitutional amendments, most joined the Republican Party. Although not the only black majority state, South Carolina was the only southern state during Reconstruction to elect a black majority of representatives to the state legislature. Beaufort County had many prominent black leaders, such as Robert Smalls, Jonathan Jasper Wright, William James Whipper, Julius I. Washington, and Thomas E. Miller.

Increasing violence during election campaigns in the state from 1868 on was used by white insurgents and paramilitary groups to suppress black voting; results were also dependent on fraud. In 1876, the Democrats regained control of the state legislature and governor's office, although results were disputed. While black Republicans continued to be elected to local office in Beaufort County and other areas through the next decades, in 1895 the Democrat-dominated state legislature passed a new constitution that effectively disfranchised most blacks through making voter registration and voting more difficult. They were excluded from the political system and kept in second-class status for decades. In 1903 the county "was reported to have 3,434 literate black males to 927 whites," but due to the discriminatory practices, nearly all blacks were barred from voting.

From 1900 through 1950, Beaufort County's economy suffered from the decline in agriculture, which together with oppressive social conditions of Jim Crow contributed to the blacks making a Great Migration out of the South. African Americans went to northern and midwestern industrial cities for jobs and became an urbanized population. The total county population of 35,495 in 1900 dropped by more than one third to 1930, and did not reach the 1900 population level again until well after 1950, when the population was 26,933. Southern Democrats in Congress helped gain the establishment of military installations in the county and state, which added more population and stimulated area jobs in the second half of the 20th century.

In addition, vacation and resort areas were developed that attracted increasing numbers of tourists through the winter season, and then others all year-round as retirees.

Geography

National protected areas
 Ashepoo-Combahee-Edisto (ACE) Basin National Estuarine Research Reserve (part)
 Ernest F. Hollings ACE Basin National Wildlife Refuge (part)
 Pinckney Island National Wildlife Refuge

State and local protected areas/sites 
 Auldbrass Plantation
 Charlesfort - Santa Elena Historic Site
 Coffin Point Plantation
 Coligny Beach Park
 Hunting Island State Park
 Old Sheldon Church Ruins
 Sea Pines Forest Preserve
 Spanish Moss Trail
 Stony Creek Bridge
 Victoria Bluff Heritage Preserve/Wildlife Management Area
 Widgeon Point Preserve

Major water bodies 
 Atlantic Ocean
 Colleton River
 Edisto River
 Harbor River
 Intracoastal Waterway
 May River
 Salkehatchie River

Adjacent counties 
 Colleton County - north
 Jasper County - west
 Hampton County - northwest

Major highways

Major infrastructure 
 Hilton Head Island Airport
 Marine Corps Air Station Beaufort
 Marine Corps Recruit Depot Parris Island

Demographics

2020 census

As of the 2020 United States census, there were 187,117 people, 73,043 households, and 50,500 families residing in the county.

2010 census
As of the 2010 United States Census, there were 162,233 people, 64,945 households, and 45,322 families living in the county. The racial makeup of the county was 71.9% white, 19.3% black or African American, 1.2% Asian, 0.3% American Indian, 0.1% Pacific islander, 5.2% from other races, and 2.1% from two or more races. Those of Hispanic or Latino origin made up 12.1% of the population. In terms of ancestry, 15.5% were German, 13.4% were Irish, 13.1% were English, 5.4% were Italian, and 5.0% were American.

Of the 64,945 households, 28.5% had children under the age of 18 living with them, 55.4% were married couples living together, 10.7% had a female householder with no husband present, 30.2% were non-families, and 24.3% of all households were made up of individuals. The average household size was 2.42 and the average family size was 2.84. The median age was 40.6 years.

The median income for a household in the county was $55,286 and the median income for a family was $65,071. Males had a median income of $41,059 versus $33,959 for females. The per capita income for the county was $32,731. About 7.4% of families and 10.5% of the population were below the poverty line, including 16.3% of those under age 18 and 5.8% of those age 65 or over.

2000 census
As of the census of 2000, there were 120,937 people, 45,532 households, and 33,056 families living in the county. The population density was 206 people per square mile (80/km2). There were 60,509 housing units at an average density of 103 per square mile (40/km2). The racial makeup of the county was 70.66% White, 23.98% Black or African American, 0.27% Native American, 0.79% Asian, 0.05% Pacific Islander, 2.84% from other races, and 1.41% from two or more races. 6.79% of the population were Hispanic or Latino of any race.

There were 45,532 households, out of which 30.40% had children under the age of 18 living with them, 58.20% were married couples living together, 11.00% had a female householder with no husband present, and 27.40% were non-families. 21.50% of all households were made up of individuals, and 8.30% had someone living alone who was 65 years of age or older. The average household size was 2.51 and the average family size was 2.90.

In the county, the population was spread out, with 23.30% under the age of 18, 12.00% from 18 to 24, 27.20% from 25 to 44, 22.10% from 45 to 64, and 15.50% who were 65 years of age or older. The median age was 36 years. For every 100 females, there were 102.40 males. For every 100 females age 18 and over, there were 102.00 males.

The median income for a household in the county was $46,992, and the median income for a family was $52,704. Males had a median income of $30,541 versus $25,284 for females. The per capita income for the county was $25,377. About 8.00% of families and 10.70% of the population were below the poverty line, including 15.40% of those under age 18 and 6.70% of those age 65 or over.

Law and government
Beaufort County is governed under the council-administrator form of government. Beaufort County Council is an elected body responsible for passing ordinances, setting county policies and developing an annual budget for the administration of public services to citizens. The chairman is elected to a two-year term by council at the first meeting in January following a general election. The vice chairman is charged with carrying out the duties of the chairman in his or her absence. Council members serve four-year staggered terms. Each council member represents one of 11 districts within the county.

Politics

Beaufort County leans Republican and has voted for that party's presidential nominee in every election since 1980. Even in the first half of the 20th century, Beaufort was routinely one of the counties in South Carolina which gave the Republicans the highest percentage of the vote. In 1920, for example, Republican nominee Warren G. Harding won only 4% of the total vote in South Carolina, but 36% in Beaufort County.

Education

Colleges and universities
 University of South Carolina Beaufort

Community, junior, and technical colleges
 Technical College of the Lowcountry

High schools

 Battery Creek High School
 Beaufort High School
 Beaufort Jasper Academy for Career Excellence
 Bluffton High School
 Hilton Head Christian Academy
 Hilton Head Island High School
 John Paul II Catholic School
 May River High School
 Whale Branch Early College High School
 Bridges Preparatory School

Communities
Beaufort County is included within the Hilton Head Island-Bluffton-Beaufort, SC Metropolitan Statistical Area.  The population was estimated to be 211,614 in 2016.

Cities
 Beaufort (county seat)

Towns
 Bluffton
 Hilton Head Island (largest town)
 Port Royal
 Yemassee (partly in Hampton County)
 Hardeeville (mostly in Jasper County)

Census-designated places
 Burton
 Daufuskie Island
 Fripp Island
 Harbor Island
 Laurel Bay
 Shell Point

Unincorporated communities

 Brighton Beach
 Dale
 Frogmore
 Lady's Island
 Lobeco
 Parris Island
 Pocotaligo
 Pritchardville
 Sheldon
 Sun City
 Seabrook

Named islands
Some islands are also towns.

 Barataria Island
 Bull Island
 Callawassie Island
 Cane Island
 Coosaw Island
 Dataw Island
 Daufuskie Island
 Fripp Island
 Grays Hill
 Harbor Island
 Hilton Head Island
 Hunting Island
 Lady's Island
 Lemon Island
 Little Capers Island (uninhabited)
 Morgan Island
 Parris Island
 Poppy Hill
 Port Royal Island
 Pritchard Island (uninhabited research station)
 Saint Helena Island
 Spring Island
 St. Phillips Island
 Warsaw Island

Notable people 

 Pat Conroy, author
 Joe Frazier, boxer
 Candice Glover, American Idol Season 12 winner
 Bob Inglis, politician
 Greg Jones, football player
 Thomas E. Miller, educator, lawyer, politician, son of Declaration signor Thomas E. Heyward, Jr.
 James Saxon, football player
 Duncan Sheik, musician
 Wayne Simmons, football player
 Robert Smalls, politician
 Stan Smith, tennis player
 Devin Taylor, football player
 D.J. Trahan, golfer
 Kathryn R. Wall, author

See also
 List of counties in South Carolina
 National Register of Historic Places listings in Beaufort County, South Carolina
 South Carolina State Parks
 National Wildlife Refuge

References

Further reading
 Lawrence S. Rowland, The History of Beaufort County, South Carolina. Columbia, SC: University of South Carolina Press, 1996.
 Stephen R. Wise and Lawrence S. Rowland, Rebellion, Reconstruction, and Redemption, 1861-1893: The History of Beaufort County, South Carolina, Volume 2. Columbia, SC: University of South Carolina Press, 2015.

External links

 
 
 Beaufort Regional Chamber of Commerce
 Beaufort County history and images
 The Beaufort Gazette - Daily newspaper circulating primarily "north of the Broad"
 The Island Packet - Daily newspaper circulating primarily "south of the Broad"

 
1769 establishments in South Carolina
Populated places established in 1769
Hilton Head Island–Beaufort micropolitan area